Jason Joseph (born 11 October 1998) is a Swiss athlete specialising in the sprint hurdles European champion in the 60 m hs (Istanbul 2023).

Career
He represented his country at the 2018 World Indoor Championships without advancing from the first round. Earlier he won a gold medal at the 2017 European U20 Championships. Prior to 2023: His personal bests are 13.12 seconds in the 110 metres hurdles (+0.7 m/s, La Chaux-de-Fonds 2021) and 7.56 seconds in the 60 metres hurdles (St.Gallen 2019).

March 2023 he won the European Athletics Indoor Championships in 7.41 for a new PB.

International competitions

References

External links

1998 births
Living people
Swiss male hurdlers
Sportspeople from Basel-Landschaft
Athletes (track and field) at the 2020 Summer Olympics
Olympic athletes of Switzerland
European Athletics Championships medalists